Miyakeomyces is a genus of fungi within the Niessliaceae family. This is a monotypic genus, containing the single species Miyakeomyces bambusae.

References

External links
Miyakeomyces at Index Fungorum

Niessliaceae
Monotypic Sordariomycetes genera